Shuler Paul Hensley (born March 6, 1967) is an American singer and actor.

Early life
Hensley was born in Atlanta, Georgia. The youngest of three children, Hensley grew up in Marietta, Georgia. His father, Sam P. Hensley Jr., is a former Georgia Tech football star, retired civil engineer and former state senator. His mother, Iris Hensley, (née Antley), was a ballerina, and later, Founder and Artistic Director of the Georgia Ballet ** Professional Company and school. Hensley had an early start in show business at the age of four when he appeared as Fritz in her production of The Nutcracker.

He was educated at The Westminster Schools and attended the University of Georgia on a baseball scholarship. After attending a recital by Jessye Norman and being cast as Judge Turpin in a college production of Sweeney Todd, he decided to leave university after his sophomore year in order to study voice at the Manhattan School of Music where he majored in opera and graduated in 1989. From there, he went to the Curtis Institute of Music, Philadelphia, and obtained his master's degree in 1993.

Career

Hensley's stage career began in the early 1990s with roles such as Pitkin in On the Town, Joe in The Most Happy Fella, and Miles Gloriosus in A Funny Thing Happened on the Way to the Forum, He has also sung in the Gilbert and Sullivan operettas Pirates of Penzance and Patience and in the operas Carmen, Faust, La bohème and Don Giovanni. And in addition to an early Oklahoma! casting as Jud Fry at the North Shore Music Theatre, Boston, Shuler also played Curly at the Skylight Opera Theatre, Milwaukee.

In 1996, he went to Hamburg, Germany to perform the title role in The Phantom of the Opera in German.

In 1998, he was cast as Jud Fry for London's National Theatre production of Oklahoma! The revival was a huge success and Hensley received wonderful personal notices as well as the Olivier Award. He continued to play the role when the show transferred to the West End (1999), the only American native in the cast, and then to Broadway (2002–2003), where he won a Tony, a Drama Desk Award and an Outer Critics Circle Award for the same role.

He has performed on several occasions with Hugh Jackman. They both performed in the musical Oklahoma! in London in 1998, as well as in the films Someone Like You, and Van Helsing, in the latter of which Hensley played Frankenstein's monster and also performed reference motion capture as Mr. Hyde. He cameoed in The Greatest Showman which starred Jackman. In 2021, Hensley and Jackman starred as Marcellus Washburn and Harold Hill in the broadway revival of The Music Man

Hensley also starred in the Broadway production of Young Frankenstein as the Monster.  For this role he was nominated for the Drama Desk Award for Outstanding Featured Actor in a Musical and the Outer Critics Circle Award for Outstanding Featured Actor in a Musical. He also reprised the role in the United States national tour which also featured his former co-stars Roger Bart and Cory English. He again played the role in the 2017 West End production.

In 2011 he portrayed American Yiddish theatre great Boris Thomashefsky in The Thomashefskys: Music and Memories of a Life in the Yiddish Theater, a concert stage show celebrating the Thomashefskys and the music of Yiddish theatre, hosted by their grandson the conductor Michael Tilson Thomas. The show aired on the PBS series Great Performances in 2012.

In 2012 he starred as a 600-pound man in the Off Broadway production of The Whale at Playwrights Horizons.

In April–May 2015, Hensley sang the role of the Celebrant in Leonard Bernstein's Mass, in a concert version with the Philadelphia Orchestra under conductor Yannick Nézet-Séguin. Later that year he appeared in a Tokyo production of Hal Prince's Prince of Broadway.

In fall 2016, Hensley co-starred with Sutton Foster in The New Group's revival of Sweet Charity.

The Georgia High School Musical Theatre Awards are also known as the Shuler Hensley Awards in his honor. The winners of these awards qualify to go on to the national Jimmy Awards.

Work

Stage productions
Broadway
 Les Misérables (Javert)
 Oklahoma! (Jud Fry)
 Tarzan (Kerchak)
 Young Frankenstein (The Monster)
 No Man's Land (Briggs)
 Waiting for Godot (Pozzo)
 The Music Man (Marcellus Washburn)

Off-Broadway
 Sweet Charity (Oscar)
 The Great American Trailer Park Musical
 Assassins (Leon Czolgosz)

Other credits
 It's All About Us - Westport Playhouse
 The Phantom of the Opera (The Phantom of the Opera) - Hamburg, Germany
 The Most Happy Fella - American Songbook / Lincoln Center
 Regina - Kennedy Center
 Young Frankenstein (The Monster) - United States National Tour & West End

Filmography 
 Oklahoma! (1999)
 Someone Like You (2001)
 A Wedding for Bella (2001)
 Van Helsing (2004)
 Opa! (2005)
 The Legend of Zorro (2005)
 Monday Night Mayhem (2002)
 After.Life (2009)
 Law & Order: Criminal Intent
 Ed
 Odd Thomas (2013)
 Neon Joe, Werewolf Hunter (2015)
 The OA (2016)
 The Greatest Showman (2017)
 Dexter: New Blood as Elric (2021)

Discography
 Oklahoma! 1998 Royal National Theatre Recording as Jud Fry
 Frankenstein, The Musical Highlights Concept/Demo Recording, released in 2001 as the Creature
 The Great American Trailer Park Musical: Off-Broadway Cast Recording released January 2006
 Tarzan: Original Broadway Cast Recording, June 2006
 Broadway's Greatest Gifts : Carols for a Cure Volume 9, 2007
 Young Frankenstein: Original Broadway Cast Recording

References

External links

 Shuler Hensley official website
 
 
 TonyAwards.com Interview with Shuler Hensley

1967 births
Living people
Male actors from Atlanta
American male film actors
American male musical theatre actors
American male television actors
Drama Desk Award winners
Manhattan School of Music alumni
Laurence Olivier Award winners
Musicians from Marietta, Georgia
Tony Award winners
University of Georgia alumni
Curtis Institute of Music alumni
The Westminster Schools alumni